Anisaspoides is a monotypic genus of Brazilian baldlegged spiders containing the single species, Anisaspoides gigantea. It was first described by Frederick Octavius Pickard-Cambridge in 1896, and is only found in Brazil.

See also
 List of Paratropididae species

References

Monotypic Mygalomorphae genera
Mygalomorphae genera
Paratropididae
Spiders of Brazil
Taxa named by Frederick Octavius Pickard-Cambridge